Bass House may refer to:

 Bass house, a style of house music that appeared in the 2010s; see Styles of house music#B
 Bass-Perry House, Seale, Alabama, listed on the NRHP in Russell County, Alabama
 Bass Boarding House, Wilton, Maine, NRHP-listed
 Bass-Morrell House, Ardmore, Tennessee, listed on the NRHP in Giles County, Tennessee

See also
 Bassline (music genre)
 Bass Building (disambiguation)
 Bass Mansion (disambiguation)
 Bass Site (disambiguation)